Shireen Anwar is a Pakistani chef and writer who is known for her work on regional recipes of Pakistan. She has been a host of Masala Mornings since 2015.

Career 
Anwar her career in 1976. She was educated at the Western food Institute New York. Formerly a housewife, she became a chef in 1990.

Anwar also started her cooking show Masala Mornings on Masala TV, for which she gained fame. Anwar has 27 years of cooking experience and has published two cookbooks in her career.

Books
 Manpasand Masala Morning
 The World On Your Table

References 

Pakistani television chefs
People from Karachi
University of Karachi alumni